Therea is a genus of crepuscular cockroach. They are found on the ground in dry areas and include many that are popular as pets.

References

External links
 Catalogue of Life
 Tree of Life

Cockroach genera